25th ADG Awards
April 10, 2021

Period Film:
Mank

Fantasy Film:
Tenet

Contemporary Film:
Da 5 Bloods
The 25th Art Directors Guild Excellence in Production Design Awards, honoring the best production designers in film, television and media of 2020, is set to be held on April 10, 2021, in a virtual ceremony. The nominations were announced on February 25, 2021.

Winners and nominees

Film

Television

Short Form

References

Art Directors Guild Awards
2020 film awards
2020 in American cinema